Hruzko-Zorianske is an urban-type settlement in Makiivka Municipality (district) in Donetsk Oblast of eastern Ukraine. Population:

Demographics
Native language as of the Ukrainian Census of 2001:
 Ukrainian 20.84%
 Russian 78.89%
 Belarusian 0.2%
 Moldovan (Romanian) 0.07%

References

Urban-type settlements in Donetsk Raion